The 2002 Monterey Sports Car Championships was the eighth round of the 2002 American Le Mans Series.  It took place at Mazda Raceway Laguna Seca, California, on September 22, 2002.

Official results
Class winners in bold.

Statistics
 Pole Position - #1 Audi Sport North America - 1:15.765
 Fastest Lap - #2 Audi Sport North America - 1:16.910
 Distance - 403.392 km
 Average Speed - 145.675 km/h

External links
 
 World Sports Racing Prototypes - Race Results

M
Monterey Sports Car Championships